My Little Pony: Equestria Girls, simply known as Equestria Girls or EQG, is a product line of fashion dolls and a media franchise launched in 2013 by the American toy company Hasbro as a spin-off of the 2010 relaunch of the My Little Pony line of pony toys and its Friendship Is Magic television series. Equestria Girls features anthropomorphized versions of My Little Pony characters from that period; as with My Little Pony, which features a colorful body and mane, Equestria Girls characters sport non-human skin and hair colors, while incorporating their pony counterpart's cutie marks (the flank symbol) in their clothing. The franchise includes various doll lines, media tie-ins, and licensed merchandise.

In addition to the Hasbro toys, Allspark Animation (previously credited under Hasbro Studios), a subsidiary of Hasbro, has commissioned animated production tie-ins, including four movies, eight television specials, and several series of animated shorts.

The Equestria Girls setting is established as a parallel counterpart to the main world of Equestria in the 2010 incarnation of My Little Pony, populated with humanoid versions of the characters from the franchise; Hasbro's marketing materials described them as "full-time students and part-time magical pony girls".

Development and release

The 2010 incarnation of My Little Pony toyline (which was originally launched in 1983, featuring colorful bodies and mane) and its associated television series My Little Pony: Friendship Is Magic, while aimed at younger children, had gained an unexpected number of older fans in their 20s and 30s, known as "bronies". Artwork produced by these fans included re-imaginings of the Friendship Is Magic cast as human equivalents. Hasbro saw this art and came up with the idea of developing the spin-off with a similar aesthetic.

The earliest known official use of the "Equestria Girls" name occurred in 2011 when the American television channel The Hub (a joint venture between Discovery Communications and Hasbro; now known as Discovery Family) released a promotional trailer for Hasbro Studio's Friendship Is Magic television series which featured a modified version of Katy Perry's "California Gurls". However, the trailer has nothing to do with the later-launched franchise.

In December 2012, Hasbro registered a trademark for the name "Equestria Girls" at the United States Patent and Trademark Office (USPTO). The franchise was briefly mentioned in the media earlier in February and March 2013. In an interview in the February/March 2013 issue of the Kidscreen magazine, Hasbro's senior vice president of international distribution and development, Finn Arnesen, called My Little Pony a "top-priority" brand for the company; the movie was described as "a new companion series" that would "[send] the pony heroes on a mission to a new world where they take on human form". Equestria Girls was announced in May 2013 with a movie and other media strategies, and it was included in Hasbro's licensing program for My Little Pony announced in June 2013, which began at the 2013 Licensing International Expo along with the company's other properties. The spin-off was to be a part of the 30th anniversary of the My Little Pony brand.

Along with the toys, Hasbro planned to produce related merchandise and media including movies, apparel, and accessories. Hasbro's chief marketing officer, John A. Frascotti, called the franchise a "major strategic initiative" for the company. The human-based toys were developed to appeal to girls in their teens as a means to extend the My Little Pony brand. In addition, Hasbro would continue its licensing deals with book publisher Little, Brown and Company and comic book publisher IDW Publishing to publish related works.

Equestria Girls is regarded as Hasbro's take on Monster High, a line of goth-themed fashion dolls launched by Mattel (one of the major rivals of Hasbro in the toy industry) in 2010. Monster High featured non-human skin and hair colors, was supported by multimedia tie-ins, and had its popularity and sales peaked in 2012 and 2013. The same year Hasbro was launching the Equestria Girls spin-off in 2013, Mattel was just launching a fairytale-themed spin-off of Monster High, named Ever After High.

In the audio commentary included in the Rainbow Rocks home media, Meghan McCarthy commented that Equestria Girls was initially not intended to become an ongoing franchise and that the thought of a sequel did not cross her mind.

Premise
Equestria Girls takes place in an alternate version of Equestria resembling modern-day Earth, whose population consists of humanoids with skins colored other than the usual human skin colors, with most being similar to their counterparts in the main My Little Pony TV series and toy line in terms of appearance and personality. Several locales in the parallel world serve as counterparts to the main cities and establishments in Equestria: for example, Canterlot High School, which corresponds to Canterlot in Equestria, is run by Principal Celestia and her sister, Vice Principal Luna, who are the equivalent of Princesses Celestia and Princess Luna, the rulers of Equestria.

Characters

The entire franchise is primarily set in a fictional world parallel to the pony-inhabited fantasy setting of the 2010 incarnation of My Little Pony, accessible via a magic mirror. The toys and other series of media additionally feature alternate humanoid versions of pony characters in roles similar to the counterparts in Equestria; characters, as depicted in the Friendship Is Magic television series, who travel between worlds assume similar forms in the alternative setting.

Main characters

The main characters are collectively referred to in merchandise as the Equestria Girls. Beginning in Rainbow Rocks, they are also the members of a rock band called the "Rainbooms". In Legend of Everfree, they assume magical abilities that come from geodes they discover.
  (voiced by Rebecca Shoichet) – A unicorn from Equestria who resides in the alternative universe as a student at Canterlot High. In the movies, the character is depicted to be a former student of Princess Celestia, who was once corrupted but is later reformed. She is the main antagonist of the first movie, but gradually puts her past behind her and completes her redemption. She is now one of the protagonists and leader of the parallel universe's counterparts of the main characters. In Friendship Games, she helps save Twilight Sparkle's parallel universe counterpart from magical corruption. She joins the Rainbooms as a rhythm guitarist and can read people's minds by physically touching them.

  (voiced by Tara Strong, singing voice by Rebecca Shoichet) – Two different incarnations of this character have appeared in the Equestria Girls franchise.
 Princess Twilight Sparkle, the winged unicorn character who appeared in Friendship Is Magic, transformed into a humanoid teenager after traveling from Equestria. In Rainbow Rocks, she temporarily assumes the role of vocalist in the Rainbooms.
 Twilight Sparkle ( Sci-Twi), the alternate universe counterpart, makes a brief appearance in a post-credits scene of Rainbow Rocks. The character formally debuts in Friendship Games as a student at Crystal Prep Academy, who temporarily becomes corrupted by Equestrian magic and eventually transfers to Canterlot High School after being saved by Sunset Shimmer. She joins the Rainbooms as a backup vocalist and has telekinetic powers.
  (voiced by Cathy Weseluck) – As with Twilight Sparkle, two versions of this character have appeared in the franchise.
 His Friendship Is Magic incarnation, a dragon, is transformed into a dog upon traveling through the portal from Equestria with Princess Twilight Sparkle. He retains the ability to speak in this form.
 His alternate universe counterpart is an ordinary dog and Sci-Twi's pet, first seen in the post-credits scene of Rainbow Rocks. In Friendship Games, he gains the ability to speak after being exposed to Equestrian magic.
  (voiced by Ashleigh Ball) – A Canterlot High student who works on her family's farm. She is the Rainbooms' bass player and has super strength.
  (voiced by Ashleigh Ball) – A student/star athlete at Canterlot High, stated to be the captain of every sports team the school has. She is the Rainbooms' electric guitarist, lead vocalist, and songwriter and has super speed.
  (voiced by Andrea Libman, singing voice by Shannon Chan-Kent) – An eccentric and friendly Canterlot High student. She is the Rainbooms' drummer and can make candies and sugary foods explosive.
  (voiced by Tabitha St. Germain, singing voice by Kazumi Evans) – A Canterlot High student and a talented seamstress, much like her Friendship Is Magic counterpart. She is the Rainbooms' keytarist and can create diamond-like force fields.
  (voiced by Andrea Libman) – A Canterlot High student who is a volunteer worker at the local animal shelter. She is the Rainbooms' tambourinist and can communicate with animals.

Supporting characters

Recurring counterparts of Friendship Is Magic characters

Canterlot High School staff
  (voiced by Nicole Oliver) – The principal of Canterlot High.
  (voiced by Tabitha St. Germain) – The vice principal of Canterlot High and Celestia's younger sister.
  (voiced by Nicole Oliver) – A teacher and librarian at Canterlot High.
  (voiced by Richard Newman) – A grumpy teacher at the school who is also a driving test instructor.
  (voiced by Tabitha St. Germain) – Applejack's grandmother and a cafeteria worker at the school.

Canterlot High School students
  (voiced by Michelle Creber, Claire Corlett and Madeleine Peters) - A club consisting of three younger students, Apple Bloom, Sweetie Belle, and Scootaloo. Apple Bloom and Sweetie Belle are the younger sisters of Applejack and Rarity, respectively.
  (voiced by Lee Tockar and Richard Ian Cox) - Two troublemaking younger students who act as Sunset Shimmer's assistants in the first movie.
  - A mute disc jockey who helps the Rainbooms defeat the Dazzlings in the second movie.
  (voiced by Peter New) - Applejack's laconic older brother.
  (voiced by Kazumi Evans) - A cellist.
  (voiced by Tabitha St. Germain) - A pretentious photographer often accompanied by two assistants, Violet Blurr and Pixel Pizzaz.
  (voiced by Kathleen Barr) - A braggart magician who helps Sunset Shimmer find the Memory Stone in Forgotten Friendship. In Rainbow Rocks she forms a new band called Trixie and the Illusions and captures the Rainbooms under an amphitheater stage.
  (voiced by Ryan Beil) - Fluttershy's younger brother.

Equestria Girls-only characters
  – Sunset Shimmer's ex-boyfriend, who takes a romantic interest in Twilight Sparkle. His Equestrian counterpart, a Royal pegasus guard at the Crystal Empire, also appears in the first movie and Forgotten Friendship, and has brief appearances in Friendship Is Magic. Both versions are voiced by Vincent Tong.
  – A trio of villainous siren sisters introduced in Rainbow Rocks. They are composed of the leader Adagio Dazzle (voiced by Kazumi Evans) and her two backup singers, the abrasive Aria Blaze (voiced by Diana Kaarina, singing voice by Shylo Sharity), and the airheaded Sonata Dusk (voiced by Maryke Hendrikse, singing voice by Madeline Merlo in Rainbow Rocks and by Shannon Chan-Kent in Sunset's Backstage Pass). In Rainbow Rocks, the trio serves as the main antagonist, having been banished to the human world by Star Swirl the Bearded and aiming to control the residents of the parallel world through their enchanted singing. They also appear in Sunset's Backstage Pass as minor characters.
  (voiced by Iris Quinn) – appears in Friendship Games as the main antagonist. She is portrayed as the strict principal of Crystal Prep Academy, a prestigious school that rivals Canterlot High School, and is obsessed with maintaining her school's reputation by manipulating her prized pupil, the human counterpart of Twilight Sparkle. In Equestria Girls: Dance Magic, it is mentioned that she was replaced as Crystal Prep's principal by Dean Cadance, the human version of Princess Cadance.
  – The Shadowbolts are Crystal Prep's sports team that opposes Canterlot High's Wondercolts team. Apart from the counterpart of Twilight Sparkle, the team includes: the blunt Sugarcoat (voiced by Sienna Bohn), two-faced Sour Sweet (voiced by Sharon Alexander), hyper-competitive Indigo Zap (voiced by Kelly Sheridan), disdainful Sunny Flare (voiced by Britt Irvin) and rocker girl Lemon Zest (voiced by Shannon Chan-Kent).
  – A counselor at Camp Everfree, who eventually transforms into a creature named Gaea Everfree after exposure to Equestrian magic. She is introduced in Legend of Everfree as the main antagonist. Enid-Raye Adams voices the character, while Kelly Metzger provides her singing voice.
  – Timber Spruce is another counselor at Camp Everfree. He is introduced in Legend of Everfree alongside Gloriosa Daisy. He is voiced by Brian Doe.
  – The main antagonist of the 2017 Equestria Girls specials Movie Magic and Mirror Magic. In Movie Magic, she sabotages her uncle's movie production in the hopes of being cast as the lead actress. In Mirror Magic, she finds an enchanted mirror that corrupts her into a diva/celebrity-esque monster. She is voiced by Ali Liebert.
  – The main antagonist of Forgotten Friendship. Ignored by the school population at large and jealous of Sunset's transformation from a hated bully to a beloved friend, she uses a mystical stone called the Memory Stone to erase Sunset's friends' good memories of her. She is voiced by Shannon Chan-Kent.
  – The main antagonist of Rollercoaster of Friendship. She is the public relations director for the new Equestria Land amusement park and relies on social media to promote it. A wisp of Equestrian magic later enchants her smartphone, allowing her to create holograms. She is voiced by Tegan Moss.
  – A pop-rock duo introduced in Sunset's Backstage Pass as the main antagonists. The duo is composed of lead vocalist and guitarist Kiwi Lollipop (K-Lo) (voiced by Lili Beaudoin, singing voice by Marie Hui) and drummer Supernova Zap (Su-Z) (voiced by Mariee Devereux, singing voice by Arielle Tuliao). They use a magical Equestrian artifact called the Time Twirler to create a time loop, inadvertenly causing Sunset Shimmer and her friends reliving the first day of the music festival.

Toys and yearly line-ups

  (2013): The first lineup to be released, it features a humanized version of My Little Pony characters from the 2010 relaunch.
  (2014): The succeeding lineup named Rainbow Rocks, featuring music-themed toys and media, was first displayed at the 2014 American International Toy Fair.
  (2015): In January 2015, at that year's edition of The Toy Fair in London, some merchandise was unveiled labeled My Little Pony Equestria Girls: Friendship Games. Some vectors for the merchandise include Applejack and Fluttershy in archery outfits, an alternative universe counterpart of Twilight Sparkle, and five new characters introduced with the lineup: Indigo Zap, Lemon Zest, Sour Sweet, Sugarcoat and Sunny Flare. Mentions on the supporting products, alongside the movie, waereincluded in Hasbro's investor presentation at the 2015 American International Toy Fair. Wondercolts and Shadowbolts dolls were released in late 2015 in two varieties: "School Spirit" classic and "Sporty Style" deluxe. In the Sporty Style assortment, the Wondercolts' Fluttershy and Applejack and the Shadowbolts' Sour Sweet and Twilight Sparkle come with a bow and a quiver of arrows. The Wondercolts' Rainbow Dash and Sunset Shimmer and the Shadowbolts' Indigo Zap and Sugarcoat come with motorcycle helmets and goggles. The Wondercolts' Pinkie Pie and Rarity and the Shadowbolts' Lemon Zest and Sunny Flare come with roller skates. A motocross bike was released in 2015.
  (2015): A lineup featuring caricatured Equestria Girls characters.
  (2016): First mentioned in a Hasbro 2016 Entertainment Plan presentation in August 2015 along with the tie-in movie of the same title, a tentative image was shown of a new character whose name was not mentioned at the time. In February 2016, at the 2016 American International Toy Fair, some Legend of Everfree merchandise was revealed. Dolls unveiled were available in four styles: "Geometric Assortment", "Crystal Gala Assortment", "Crystal Wings Assortment" and "Boho Assortment". A new character by the name of Gloriosa Daisy was also revealed during the presentation. The toys were released in July 2016.
  (2017–2020): An updated lineup featuring newly-re-styled caricatured Equestria Girls characters.

Media

Animated productions

Hasbro Studios/Allspark Animation productions

Allspark Animation (previously credited under Hasbro Studios), a subsidiary of Hasbro, has commissioned the production of several animated movies, specials, and shorts (except Equestria Girls Minis shorts). Most of the animated media were produced by DHX Studios Vancouver's 2D animation team in Canada, except the Canterlot Shorts from 2017, which were produced by Boulder Media in the Republic of Ireland (a company acquired by Hasbro in 2016).

The following works were produced under this scope:

Equestria Girls Minis shorts
A media tie-in to promote the Equestria Girls Minis toy line, the animated shorts ranging from 15 to 30 seconds in length were showcased on various online outlets including the toy line's official website and official YouTube channel beginning in late 2015.

The animation studio which produced the shorts is yet to be identified.

Publications

Books
The following juvenile fiction chapter books are originally published by Little, Brown and Company imprint of Hachette Book Group USA. The Orchard Book's imprint of Hachette UK, as well as The Five Mile Press in Australia, also published the books. The dates listed are the American publish dates.

Other than the chapter books, the following books were also published by the LB Kids imprint.

Comics

A special short story, featuring the origins of Sunset Shimmer, was published in the IDW My Little Pony: Friendship Is Magic 2013 San Diego Comic-Con comic variant in July 2013. It also included additional stories in a stand-alone issue, titled My Little Pony Annual 2013: Equestria Girls, released on October 30, 2013.

An issue of IDW's Fiendship Is Magic features the Sirens, the evil creatures that appeared in Rainbow Rocks.

Live-action music videos

Up until the Friendship Games lineup, Hasbro has been releasing a series of live-action music videos to promote the toy line. The videos feature female dancers, dressed as the protagonists, dancing  to the renditions of the song "Equestria Girls", a number heard in the first Equestria Girls movie.

With the first lineup, Hasbro released a live-action music video, titled Magic of Friendship, on the Entertainment Weekly website on August 30, 2013, depicting seven teenage girls, as the six protagonists and Sunset Shimmer, doing a new dance routine called "The EG Stomp" in a school cafeteria to a shorter Toy Commercial version of the "Equestria Girls" song.

On February 20, 2014, Hasbro released a new live-action music video on its official website to coincide with the Rainbow Rocks lineup, depicting the protagonists in a rock band. The music video, also titled Rainbow Rocks, uses a rock version of the "Equestria Girls" song and portrays the protagonists performing the "EG Stomp". Through the Equestria Girls YouTube channel, another music video was released on August 4, 2014. It depicts four more teenage girls, each one dressed as the Dazzlings and DJ Pon-3 respectively. In February 2015, another music video titled "Rainbooms Remix" was released.

On August 14, 2015, the same year the Friendship Games lineup was launched, Hasbro released a live-action music video on its website, depicting five of the six protagonists as well as Sunset Shimmer in a sporting competition against Crystal Prep's Twilight Sparkle.

Video and website games

On October 15, 2013, Gameloft's My Little Pony mobile game was updated to include the Equestria Girls mini-game.

A Rainbow Rocks missile command-type mini-game was added to the Hasbro Arcade mobile app on April 8, 2014. On October 29, 2014, the mini-game was updated to include the Dazzlings with two songs from the movie and one song from one of the live-action music videos.

On June 7, 2014, a Rainbow Rocks game titled "Repeat the Beat" was released on Hasbro's Equestria Girls website; almost two months later, two more games have been released on July 31, 2014, one of them being "Equestria Girls: Battle of the Bands" and the other being "Equestria Girls: V.I.F. (Very Important Friend)".

On August 4, 2015, a Friendship Games game titled "Archery Game" was released on Hasbro's Equestria Girls website.

Other Merchandise

Soundtracks

 My Little Pony: Equestria Girls – Soundtrack (2013)
 Equestria Girls: Rainbow Rocks – Soundtrack (2014)
 Equestria Girls: Friendship Games – Soundtrack (2015)
 Equestria Girls: Legend of Everfree – Soundtrack (2016)
The My Little Pony 2015 Convention Collection released for San Diego Comic-Con International 2015 contains select songs from the first two movies: Equestria Girls and Rainbow Rocks.

Reception
There has been criticism over the anthropomorphism approach of the toy line, as well as the franchise overall. Before the Equestria Girls movie's release, several mothers spoke to the New York Daily News stating concerns about the humanized characters, describing them as "too sexy", "anorexic", and "going back to the original Barbie" or "looking like Bratz dolls", and several feared allowing their children to be influenced by the looks. However, some considered it reasonable with other current media such as The Little Mermaid, with one parent stating she felt that it isn't "any worse than Ariel in a bikini top for two hours". Slates Amanda Marcotte considered that the characters' change to human form was to popularize Equestria Girls with the adult fanbase of Friendship Is Magic, who she claims "have expressed a strong interest in seeing the Ponies in sexy, humanized forms". However, many of these adult fans expressed disappointment in the announcement of the franchise and the characters, considering Equestria Girls to be trying to pander to this older audience, and that the approach "goes against everything that Pony was trying to prove". Craig McCracken, speaking for his wife Lauren Faust, Friendship Is Magics creative showrunner for the first two seasons before stepping down, stated that McCracken felt she "wasn't the biggest fan" of Equestria Girls, opining that the approach of turning the pony characters into humans would have gone against the way she wanted to take the television series.

Being largely a part of a toy line and media franchise from Hasbro, the criticism against commercialization was taken into account when reviewing the movies and specials from the Equestria Girls series, whose reception has generally been mixed to positive for retaining the quality of the Friendship Is Magic television series. When reviewing the Friendship Games movie, Mike Cahill of The Guardian gave the movie two out of five stars, calling it "craven commercialism", but adding that "it's not unattractively designed, and its peppy collegiate spirit trumps the sappiness of Disney's Tinkerbell spin-offs". Conversely, Adam Lemuz of Geekscape gave the same movie a four out of five, praising its animation, music, directing and writing.

References

See also
 My Little Pony
 My Little Pony (2010 toyline)
 My Little Pony: Friendship Is Magic

 
 Products introduced in 2013
 Mass media franchises introduced in 2013